Foord & Massey Furniture Company Building is a historic warehouse and showroom located at Wilmington, New Castle County, Delaware. It was built between 1917 and 1919, and is a five-story, five bay by four bay, brick commercial building.  It has Collegiate Gothic Revival elements, one of the few commercial buildings in the immediate area designed in this style.

It was added to the National Register of Historic Places in 2006.

References

Commercial buildings on the National Register of Historic Places in Delaware
Collegiate Gothic architecture in the United States
Commercial buildings completed in 1919
Buildings and structures in Wilmington, Delaware
National Register of Historic Places in Wilmington, Delaware